Edmund Stadler (10 October 1908 – 30 July 1979) was a German long-distance runner. He competed in the men's 5000 metres at the 1936 Summer Olympics.

References

1908 births
1979 deaths
Athletes (track and field) at the 1936 Summer Olympics
German male long-distance runners
Olympic athletes of Germany
Place of birth missing